Asura umbrifera is a moth of the family Erebidae first described by George Hampson in 1900. It is found in Tibet.

References

umbrifera
Moths described in 1900
Moths of Asia